Justin Lowe Quackenbush (born October 3, 1929) is a senior United States district judge of the United States District Court for the Eastern District of Washington.

Education and career
Quackenbush was born in Spokane, Washington on October 3, 1929. His father, Carl Quackenbush, was a law student who eventually became a Superior Court judge in Spokane. Quackenbush received a Bachelor of Arts degree from the University of Idaho in 1951. He received a Bachelor of Laws from Gonzaga University School of Law, his father's alma mater, in 1957. He was an officer in the United States Navy from 1951 to 1954. He was a deputy prosecuting attorney in Spokane County, Washington from 1957 to 1959. He was in private practice in Spokane from 1959 until his judicial nomination. He was active in Democratic Party politics, regularly serving as the campaign manager for Tom Foley's successful Congressional election campaigns starting in 1964 for over a decade. Quackenbush also taught at Gonzaga University School of Law from 1961 to 1967, and was an active Mason.

Federal judicial service
On May 9, 1980, President Jimmy Carter nominated Quackenbush to the seat on the United States District Court for the Eastern District of Washington vacated by Judge Marshall Allen Neill. He was confirmed by the United States Senate on June 18, 1980, and received his commission the same day. Because Neill was the only judge in the district, and had died in October 1979, Quackenbush and fellow appointee Judge Robert James McNichols immediately faced a tremendous backlog of cases. Quackenbush served as Chief Judge from 1989 to June 27, 1995, when he assumed senior status.

References

Sources
 

1929 births
Living people
Lawyers from Spokane, Washington
University of Idaho alumni
Gonzaga University School of Law alumni
Gonzaga University faculty
Judges of the United States District Court for the Eastern District of Washington
United States district court judges appointed by Jimmy Carter
20th-century American judges
United States Navy officers
21st-century American judges